Ernesto Cofiño (June 5, 1899 – October 17, 1991) was a Guatemalan physician. He was a pioneer in pediatric research in Guatemala. He founded hospitals, was director of Caritas de Guatelama, and promoted youth development. Having died with a reputation for sanctity, his cause of beatification was granted a nihil obstat by the Congregation for the Causes of Saints on July 7, 2000.

Life and works
Ernesto Guillermo Cofiño was born in Guatemala City on June 5, 1899. He married in 1933 Clemencia Samayoa Rubio, and raised five children. He lived as a widower for 25 years, helping raise 21 grandchildren.

In 1919, he started his studies at the Faculty of Medicine of the University of Sorbonne, France. In 1929 he graduated as a surgeon.

Cofiño was the first University Professor of Pediatrics in the Universidad de San Carlos de Guatemala medical school, where he taught for 24 years. He was a member of the American Academy of Pediatrics and the French Language Association of Pediatrics.

He was involved in several medical positions.
Sanatorio Antituberculoso Infantil in San Juan Sacatepéquez (Children's Antituberculosis Hospital) - Founder (1942)
Unidad Asistencial de San Juan (St. John Assistantial Unit) - Founder (1946)
Centro Educativo Asistencial (formerly Hospicio Nacional) - Director from 1951 to 1955
Sociedad Protectora del Niño (Society for the Protection of children) - Director (1940–1946)
Lucha Nacional contra la Tuberculosis (National Fight against Tuberculosis) - Director (1945–1946)
Asociación de Guarderías Infantiles de Bienestar Social - Interventor (1954)
Caritas de Guatemala - Director for 3 years. Organized the distribution of food for 90,000 from the poor villages
Instituto Interamericano del Niño (Interamerican Institute for the Child)- Guatemalan Delegate (1945–1955)
Fundación para el Desarrollo Integral (FUDI), a help to the victims of the earthquake of 1971, now the organizer of Centro de Formación Rural Utz Samaj - Cofounder

In 1945, he founded together with others the Pediatric Association of Guatemala.

For the youth, he promoted the following:
Centro Universitario Ciudad Vieja - First Rector (1958)
Instituto Femenino de Estudios Superiores (IFES)
Residencia de Estudiantes Verapaz
Centro de Formación Profesional para la Mujer Junkabal
Centro Educativo Técnico Laboral Kinal

He was also much involved in the movement to outlaw abortion, considered "one of the founders of the pro-life campaign" in Guatemala.

In 1956 he requested admission to Opus Dei. Through this, he was said to have learned how to sanctify his work, "imbuing his exquisite social sensibility and his great professional sense with an urgent zeal for the rechristianization of society."

When he was 80 years old, he was diagnosed with cancer in the jaw. He continued working until he finally succumbed to a resurgence of the cancer when he was 92. Within the Catholic faith, he may be referred to as "Ernesto Cofiño, Servant of God".

Sources and external links
Opening of Cause of Beatification

People from Guatemala City
Opus Dei members
Guatemalan anti-abortion activists
Guatemalan surgeons
Guatemalan pediatricians
University of Paris alumni
Academic staff of Universidad de San Carlos de Guatemala
1991 deaths
1899 births
Guatemalan activists
Guatemalan Roman Catholics
Roman Catholic activists
20th-century surgeons
Guatemalan expatriates in France